The Santa Clause 2 is a 2002 American Christmas comedy film directed by Michael Lembeck in his directorial debut. It is a sequel to The Santa Clause (1994) and the second installment in The Santa Clause franchise. All of the principal actors from the first film, including Tim Allen, Eric Lloyd, Judge Reinhold, Wendy Crewson, and David Krumholtz, reprise their roles, and are joined by Elizabeth Mitchell, Spencer Breslin, and Liliana Mumy.
Released on November 1, 2002, the film received mixed reviews from critics and grossed $172 million worldwide on a $65 million budget. It was followed by another sequel, The Santa Clause 3: The Escape Clause, released in 2006.

Plot 

Eight years have passed since Scott Calvin took on the mantle of Santa Claus. Head Elf Bernard and Curtis, the Keeper of the Handbook of Christmas, inform Scott that there is another clause — the "Mrs. Clause". Scott is now pressed to get married before the next Christmas Eve or the clause will be broken and he will stop being Santa forever. At the same time, Abby the Elf delivers even more distressing news: Scott's teenage son Charlie is on the naughty list, due to having vandalized his school to get attention. Scott must return to his home to search for a wife and set things right with Charlie. He brings this up when visited by the Council of Legendary Figures, consisting of Mother Nature, Father Time, Cupid, the Easter Bunny, the Tooth Fairy, and the Sandman. To cover for Santa's prolonged absence, Curtis helps Scott create a life-sized animatronic Santa clone, much to Bernard's horror. However, at Santa's request, Bernard reluctantly plays along, and tells the other elves that Santa had a makeover, so they will not question the double's synthetic appearance.

Because of the impending end of his contract, Scott undergoes a "de-Santafication process" that gradually turns him back into Scott Calvin. He has a limited amount of magic to help him. Scott returns home to his former wife Laura, her husband Neil, their six-year-old daughter Lucy, and Charlie. He and Charlie face the ire of school principal Carol Newman when Charlie defaces the lockers.

At the North Pole, Toy Santa follows the rulebook too literally and begins to think that everyone in the world is naughty because of their small mistakes. As a result, Toy Santa takes over the North Pole using giant toy soldiers he made himself and unveils his plan to the elves to give lumps of coal to the world. Bernard exposes Toy Santa as a fraud, and Toy Santa places him under house arrest.

After a few failed dates, Scott finds himself falling for Carol. He accompanies her in a horse-drawn sleigh to the faculty Christmas party, during which she confesses she used to believe in Santa as a child, until she was forced to stop doing so by her parents after fighting with children who told her Santa was not real. Using a little of his Christmas magic, Scott enlivens the otherwise dull party by presenting everyone with their childhood dream gifts. He makes a special presentation to Carol, and, with his last remnant of magic, wins her over and they kiss under mistletoe. However, when Scott attempts to explain to her that he is Santa, she believes that he is mocking her childhood, and throws him out. Later, Charlie is upset about Scott dating his principal and he confesses how hard it is for him that Scott is never around like other fathers, and reveals the pressure he is under to conceal the secret that his father is Santa. Lucy manages to convince Charlie not to be mad at him, which leads Charlie to convince Carol that Scott is Santa by showing her the magic snow globe he received during Scott's initial transformation.

Curtis flies in to tell Scott about Toy Santa's plan. However, Scott has used up the last of his magic wooing Carol, and cannot return to the North Pole. With help from the Tooth Fairy, Scott and Curtis manage to get back, only for Toy Santa to find them and tie them up. Charlie and Carol spring them free by summoning the Tooth Fairy to fly them to the North Pole. Scott goes after Toy Santa, who has already left with the sleigh, riding Chet, a rambunctious reindeer-in-training, and they both crash back into the village. With an army of elves, Carol, Bernard, Charlie, and Curtis lead them into a snowball fight to overthrow the toy soldiers. Toy Santa is defeated and reduced to a six-inch height, Scott marries Carol in a ceremony presided over by Mother Nature, Scott transforms back into Santa and Carol transforms into Mrs. Claus, and Christmas proceeds as it always has. Scott and Charlie reveal the truth to Lucy about Scott being Santa Claus, promising to keep his secret.

Cast

Reindeer voice cast
 Bob Bergen as Comet
 Kath Soucie as Chet

Production 
In July 2000, it was announced Disney intended to move forward with a sequel to The Santa Clause with the initial draft written by Don Rhymer where the North Pole is operating at maximum efficiency until Santa is confronted with the challenge of balancing work and personal life. Michael Lembeck became attached to direct in November of that year.  In April 2001, Cinco Paul and Ken Daurio were brought on by Disney to pen another draft of the sequel.

The film was shot in Vancouver, British Columbia and at Mammoth Studios in Burnaby, British Columbia.

A teaser trailer for this film originally referred to it as Santa Clause 2: The Escape Clause, scheduled for release on November 21, 2001. The subtitle would later become the subtitle of the following sequel in 2006.

Reception

Critical response 
In comparison to the first film, The Santa Clause 2 received mixed reviews. The site's critical consensus reads, "Though it's harmless as family entertainment and has moments of charm, The Santa Clause 2 is also predictable and forgettable." On Metacritic, which assigns a normalized rating to reviews, the film has a weighted average score of 48 out of 100, based on 26 critics, indicating "mixed or average reviews". Audiences polled by CinemaScore gave the film an average grade of "A" on an A+ to F scale.

Roger Ebert for the Chicago Sun-Times found it "more engaging, assured and funny" than the first film, with a "nice acerbic undertone". Keith Phipps for the A.V. Club wrote, "Despite the obviously mercenary nature of this sequel, there's a thimbleful of clever ideas at work here, most notably in the way Allen's RoboSanta begins to turn his toy factory into a tiny dictatorship." Claudia Puig called it a "trite, predictable rehash."

The Santa Clause 2 was nominated for a Saturn Award for Best Fantasy Film.

Box office 
During its opening weekend, The Santa Clause 2 generated $29 million, more than its predecessor, and was ranked in first place at the box office. While the film was overtaken by 8 Mile a week later, it still made a total of $24.7 million. It would later go on to compete against Harry Potter and the Chamber of Secrets and Die Another Day. These three sequels would win the Thanksgiving weekend. The film would run strong at the box office while dominating Disney's other film Treasure Planet. The Santa Clause 2 grossed $139.2 million in the United States and Canada, and $33.6 million in other territories, for a total of $172.8 million, against a production budget of $65 million. It was the fifth-highest-grossing holiday movie.

Soundtrack

Home media 
The Santa Clause 2 was released on DVD and VHS on November 18, 2003. The DVD release is THX certified and consists of widescreen and pan and scan fullscreen versions. Along with the other two Santa Clause films, it was re-released in a 3-Movie Collection DVD set in 2007 and a 3-Movie Collection Blu-ray set on October 16, 2012.

See also
 List of Christmas films
 Santa Claus in film

Notes

References

External links 

 
 
 
 

2002 films
2002 fantasy films
2002 romantic comedy films
2000s children's fantasy films
American children's comedy films
2000s children's comedy films
American Christmas comedy films
American fantasy comedy films
American romantic comedy films
American romantic fantasy films
American sequel films
Android (robot) films
Films directed by Michael Lembeck
Puppet films
Films scored by George S. Clinton
Films shot in British Columbia
Films with screenplays by Cinco Paul and Ken Daurio
Santa Claus in film
Sandman in film
Walt Disney Pictures films
2000s fantasy comedy films
2000s Christmas comedy films
2002 directorial debut films
Easter Bunny in film
2000s English-language films
2000s American films
The Santa Clause (franchise)